The Green Party of Vancouver, founded in 1984, is a municipal political party in Vancouver, British Columbia, Canada. It is affiliated with both the provincial Green Party of British Columbia and the federal Green Party of Canada. They are contested the 2022 Vancouver municipal election with a slate of ten candidates: five for city council, two for park board, and three for school board.

Roslyn Cassells was the first elected Green in Canada and was elected to the Vancouver Park Board in the 1999 Vancouver municipal election. In 2002, Andrea Reimer was elected to the Vancouver School Board as a trustee, and in 2008 Stuart Mackinnon was elected a park board commissioner.

The party nominated Green Party of Canada deputy leader Adriane Carr as their sole nominee for Vancouver City Council during the 2011 Vancouver municipal election. Carr subsequently won the seat. Carr retained her council seat during the 2014 Vancouver municipal election, winning with the highest number of votes of any council candidate. School board candidate Janet Fraser and park board candidates Michael Wiebe and Stuart Mackinnon were also elected.

The Green Party of Vancouver further increased its seat count following the 2017 Vancouver municipal by-election, where all three of the party's school board candidates were elected. The party elected nine candidates in the 2018 Vancouver municipal election.

2022 slate

City council 

 Adriane Carr (incumbent)
 Pete Fry
 Michael Wiebe
 David Wong

Park board 

 Tom Digby
 Tricia Riley

School board 

 Lois Chan-Pedley (incumbent)
 Janet Fraser (incumbent)
 Nick Poppel

2022 platform
For the 2022 Vancouver municipal election, the Green Party of Vancouver lists the following priorities:

Council
 Housing:
 Set housing targets based on local incomes and needs
 Ensure the city-wide Vancouver Plan delivers needed housing and community amenities
 Maximize the City’s zoning powers to deliver most-needed housing
 Reduce obstacles to developing new affordable and climate-smart housing
 Protect renters’ homes, safety, and income
 Better leverage City assets to deliver affordable housing
 Expand support and solutions for unhoused Vancouverites

 Complete connected communities
 Create a 5-minute city
 Connect and complete Vancouver’s safe cycling networks & greenways within four years
 Expand public amenities and services to meet growth and public needs
 Expand public amenities and services to meet growth and public needs
 Incorporate schools & childcare in planning
 Resilient local shopping streets and economies

 Bold climate action
 Climate-smart, safe, and resilient buildings
 Increase local food security
 Active transportation and transit
 Responsible climate planning
 Climate advocacy

 Restored ecosystems
 Increase tree canopy city-wide
 Rewild our city
 Healthy air and water
 Become a zero-waste city

Park board
 Supporting healthy, connected communities
 Advancing reconciliation
 Upgrading community services
 Building modern and climate-resilient facilities
 Enhancing our urban ecosystem
 Improving access and inclusion

School board
 Student success
 Inclusive learning for all students
 Healthy community partnerships
 Fully funded public education
 Food security and public education
 Land and rights acknowledgement
 School climate action
 Good governance and stewardship

Electoral results

Prior to 2014

Roslyn Cassels was the first elected Green in Canada and was elected to the Vancouver Park Board in the 1999 Vancouver municipal election. In 2002, Andrea Reimer was elected to the Vancouver School Board as a Trustee, and in 2008 Stuart Mackinnon was elected a Park Board Commissioner. Adriane Carr was elected in 2011 as the first Green city councillor.

2014 municipal election

The Green Party of Vancouver nominated seven candidates for the 2014 Vancouver municipal election, held on 15 November 2014. Adriane Carr received the most votes of any council candidate.

School board candidate Janet Fraser and Park Board candidates Michael Wiebe and Stuart Mackinnon were also elected.

2017 municipal by-election

The 2017 Vancouver municipal by-election was called to replace a single vacant council seat, due to Geoff Meggs' departure to take on the role of Premier John Horgan's chief of staff. The by-election was also meant to elect a new board of school trustees, who had been dismissed by provincial education minister Mike Bernier after failing to pass a balanced budget and allegations of workplace harassment arose.

The Green Party of Vancouver ran Pete Fry for council and Janet Fraser, Estrellita Gonzalez and Judy Zaichkowsky for school board. All three school trustee candidates were elected, finishing in the top three spots. Non-Partisan Association candidate Hector Bremner was elected to council, and Fry finished a close third behind anti-poverty activist Jean Swanson.

2018 municipal election

The Green Party of Vancouver nominated 11 candidates to run in the 2018 Vancouver municipal election on 28 June 2018. School board candidate Nicholas Chernen resigned on 9 July 2018 after it was discovered that he had failed to disclose his involvement in a pending lawsuit to the party, resulting in the party running four council candidates, three school board candidates, and three park board candidates. Prior to the election, both the Vancouver School Board and Park Board were chaired by Green Party incumbents.

The Green Party elected nine candidates in the municipal election. Carr, Fry and Wiebe were elected to city council and all the party's school and parks board candidates were elected.

References

External links

1984 establishments in British Columbia
Vancouver
Vancouver
Municipal political parties in Vancouver
Political parties established in 1984